Midway Mill was a historic grist mill located at Midway Mills, Nelson County, Virginia.  It was built in 1787 by William H. Cabell (1772–1853), with minor alterations in 1810.  It was a 4 1/4-story, uncoarsed ashlar stone rectangular structure with a slate gable roof.  Associated with the mill were the contributing stone arch bridge and the late-19th century frame Simpson House.  It once stood beside the James River and Kanawha Canal at the halfway point on the James River between Lynchburg and Richmond.  It was demolished in 1998.

It was listed on the National Register of Historic Places in 1973, and delisted in 2001.

References

Former National Register of Historic Places in Virginia
Grinding mills on the National Register of Historic Places in Virginia
Buildings and structures in Nelson County, Virginia
National Register of Historic Places in Nelson County, Virginia
Industrial buildings completed in 1787
Grinding mills in Virginia
Demolished buildings and structures in Virginia
1787 establishments in Virginia
Cabell family